Keith Frederick Thomas (15 April 1929 – 27 October 2017) was an Australian rules footballer who played with South Melbourne in the Victorian Football League (VFL). He died on 27 October 2017, at the age of 88.

Notes

External links 

1929 births
2017 deaths
Australian rules footballers from New South Wales
Sydney Swans players
Albury Football Club players